Eucorys barbouri is a species of large sea snail, a marine gastropod mollusk in the family Cassidae, the helmet snails and bonnet snails.

Distribution
Recorded from offshore Barbados.

Description 
The maximum recorded shell length is 65 mm.

Habitat 
Minimum recorded depth is 238 m. Maximum recorded depth is 1829 m.

References

Cassidae
Molluscs of the Atlantic Ocean
Gastropods described in 1939
Taxa named by William J. Clench